Ormåsen is a village in Buskerud,  Norway. It is a  residential area located  the municipality of Øvre Eiker. The village was built during 1986. Ormåsen is located midway between Hokksund and Vestfossen. , the population was 809.

References

External links 
 Ormåsen Weather station

Villages in Buskerud
Øvre Eiker